Yucilix is a monotypic moth genus in the family Drepanidae described by Yang in 1978. Its only species, Yucilix xia, described by the same author in the same year, is found in China.

References

Drepanidae
Monotypic moth genera
Moths of Asia
Drepanidae genera